Tanah Merah (or Tanamerah, literally means Red Land) is a town in South Papua province of Indonesia (not to be confused with Tanahmerah Bay) on the bank of Digul river, located some two hundred miles from Merauke within the interior of Western New Guinea (a town not occupied by the Japanese during WWII). It is the administrative center of Boven Digoel Regency.

History
The town acted as a Dutch penal colony during the period when Indonesia was a Dutch colony.

Under Indische Staatsregeling Article 37, "those who can be considered by the Government to disturb or have disturbed the public peace and order will be without any legal proceedings exiled for an indefinite period to a specially appointed place" were sent to Tanahmerah. Dr Sutan Sjahrir, first prime minister of the Indonesian Republic, described the political prisoners thus exiled as being in "profound spiritual misery" and "permanently broken in spirit".

In 1942, the "Netherlands East Indies Government-in-Exile" (in Australia), fearing partisan armies, which would prejudice postwar reimposition of Dutch colonial rule in the Indies, organised for the prisoners to be brought to Australia, to be interned as prisoners of war. This did not fit entirely well with the host country, and on 7 December 1943, the Tanah Merah prisoners were freed from their Australian prison camps. 

Lockwood (1975) considers the evacuation of these prisoners to Australia (and their subsequent freedom within Australia) to be a vital catalyst  in the launching of the boycott on Dutch shipping (the Black Armada) at the end of the second world war, and in the subsequent creation of the Republic of Indonesia.

Transport
The town is served by Tanah Merah Airport.

See also
 Rupert Lockwood: Black Armada
 Black Armada

Notes

Western New Guinea
Regency seats of South Papua